"No Name" (stylized as "NO NAME") is a song by American rapper NF. It was released as a single on January 19, 2018.

Background
NF raps about his growth as an artist, dealing with fame and his new found success.

Feuerstein dedicated the song to his come up from his worldwide hit, Let You Down. He discussed his success in an interview with New Musical Express:

Music video
The official music video was released on January 18, 2018, on NF's Vevo channel. The video showcases NF rapping in a dark alleyway.

Track listing

Charts

Certifications

References

2018 singles
2018 songs
NF (rapper) songs
Songs written by Tommee Profitt
Songs written by NF (rapper)